Scott F. Benedict is a United States Marine Corps major general who serves as the commander of the 2nd Marine Aircraft Wing since July 1, 2022. He most recently served as the Director of Strategy, Plans, and Policy of United States Central Command from August 2020 to June 2022.

References

External links

Year of birth missing (living people)
Living people
Place of birth missing (living people)
United States Marine Corps generals